Michael Justin Zagurski (born January 27, 1983), is an American former professional baseball pitcher. He previously played in Major League Baseball (MLB) for the Philadelphia Phillies, Arizona Diamondbacks, Pittsburgh Pirates, and New York Yankees. Zagurski has also played in Nippon Professional Baseball (NPB) for the Hiroshima Toyo Carp and Yokohama DeNA BayStars.

Amateur career
Zagurski attended Millard North High School. Zagurski was neither drafted after high school nor recruited by any four-year colleges. He started his college career at Hutchinson Community College and finished at University of Kansas, where he set the single season record for strikeouts.

Zagurski played for the Anchorage Glacier Pilots of the Alaska Baseball League in 2004.

Professional career

Philadelphia Phillies
Zagurski was drafted by the Philadelphia Phillies in the 12th round of the 2005 MLB Draft. After two seasons in the low minors, he started the  season with the Single-A Clearwater Threshers before being promoted to the Double-A Reading Phillies.  On May 25, when Brett Myers was placed on the disabled list, Zagurski was placed on the Phillies major league roster. He made his first appearance that evening.

"The only thing I could say was, 'wow,'" he later told The Philadelphia Inquirer.

Almost 60 of the pitcher's friends, former teammates, and family were in attendance at Zagurski's first major league appearance at the Atlanta Braves' Turner Field. Legendary broadcaster Harry Kalas remarked on the cheers that greeted Zagurski's entry to the game and added that the 'Phillies might have themselves a left-hander' after Zagurski retired the first three batters he faced.

Zagurski walked New York Mets pinch hitter Julio Franco, who made his major league debut for the Phillies the year before Zagurski was born, and retired San Francisco Giants outfielder Barry Bonds less than two weeks after being called up. On the possibility of pitching to the potential future Hall of Famer, Zagurski had said, "Having an opportunity to face [Bonds] would be awesome. I'm sure I would notice him, but he's still trying to hit the ball and I'm still trying to get him out, so I think the star-strucking will stop"

On June 7, Zagurski won his first major league game as the Phillies completed a three-game sweep of the first-place New York Mets at Shea Stadium. Phillies color commentator Gary Matthews said Zagurski believed he had a place in the major leagues and that the young pitcher was "not at all in awe of being here." Phillies manager Charlie Manuel said after the game that Zagurski "has a future in the big leagues, and he definitely has a future with us."

On July 15, Zagurski pitched the entire ninth inning of the Phillies' 10,000th franchise loss. The game, which was carried nationally on ESPN's Sunday Night Baseball, saw the St. Louis Cardinals beat the Phillies 10–2.

On July 27, Myers was activated from the 15-day disabled list and the Phillies optioned Zagurski to the Triple-A Ottawa Lynx. On August 15, Zagurski was recalled to the majors when starter Adam Eaton was placed on the 15-day disabled list.

On April 3, 2008, Zagurski underwent season-ending Tommy John surgery and missed the entire 2008 season.

Zagurski started the 2010 season with the Lehigh Valley IronPigs, the Triple-A Affiliate of the Phillies, and was recalled to the major league club on June 22, 2010. He pitched  innings in his return, allowing one walk and one strikeout.

Zagurski was designated for assignment by the Phillies on September 16, 2011.

Arizona Diamondbacks
Zagurski was traded by the Phillies to the Arizona Diamondbacks on September 23, 2011 in exchange for a minor league pitcher. On April 4, 2012, Zagurski was out righted to the minors, removing him from the major league roster.

Pittsburgh Pirates
Zagurski signed with the Pittsburgh Pirates on December 1, 2012. He was designated for assignment on June 14, 2013 to make room on the Pirates' roster for Brandon Cumpton.

New York Yankees
Zagurski signed a minor league deal with the New York Yankees on June 21, 2013. He opted out of his minor league deal on August 16.

Oakland Athletics
Zagurski signed a minor league deal with the Oakland Athletics on August 18, 2013. He was released on September 2, after making 6 appearances for their Triple-A affiliate Sacramento River Cats.

Second stint with Yankees
Zagurski re-signed with the New York Yankees on September 10, 2013. He made his Yankee debut on September 15 at Fenway Park against the Boston Red Sox. He was outrighted off the roster on October 3.

Cleveland Indians
Zagurski signed a minor league deal with the Cleveland Indians on November 22, 2013. Zagurski was assigned to the Triple-A Columbus Clippers. He was released on May 24, 2014.

Toronto Blue Jays
On May 27, 2014, Zagurski signed a minor league deal with the Toronto Blue Jays. He was added to the Triple-A Buffalo Bisons roster on May 30. On September 2, Zagurski asked for and was granted his release from the Blue Jays organization. He posted a 4–1 record in 2014, with a 2.08 ERA and 83 strikeouts in 60 innings.

Hiroshima Toyo Carp
On October 21, 2014, it was announced that Zagurski had signed a contract with the Hiroshima Toyo Carp. Zagurski pitched in 19 games for the Carp in 2015, recording no decisions, with 16 strikeouts in 15 innings pitched and a 2.40 ERA.

Yokohama DeNA BayStars
On April 5, 2016, Zagurski signed with the Yokohama DeNA BayStars of Nippon Professional Baseball. Zagurski appeared in 32 games for the BayStars in 2016. He posted a 3-1 record with a 4.96 ERA. He struck out 34 batters in 32 innings pitched.

Detroit Tigers
On February 5, 2017, Zagurski signed a minor league contract with the Detroit Tigers. He was released on June 15.

Milwaukee Brewers
On December 17, 2017, Zagurski signed a minor league contract with the Milwaukee Brewers.
On June 27, his minor league contract was bought by the Brewers, promoting him to the Majors. Three days later, Zagurski made his first Major League appearance since the 2013 season, earning his first career loss against the Cincinnati Reds. This set the MLB record for the longest time between a pitcher's first career win and loss at 11 years, 23 days. Zagurski was designated for assignment on July 8, 2018. He was later optioned to Triple-A Colorado Springs. He declared free agency on October 15, 2018.

Chicago Cubs
On December 19, 2018, Zagurski signed a minor league contract with the Chicago Cubs. He was released on March 24, 2019.

References

External links

Mike Zagurski at Baseball Almanac
 Kansas Jayhawks bio

1983 births
Living people
American expatriate baseball players in Canada
American expatriate baseball players in Japan
Arizona Diamondbacks players
Baseball players from Nebraska
Batavia Muckdogs players
Buffalo Bisons (minor league) players
Clearwater Threshers players
Colorado Springs Sky Sox players
Erie SeaWolves players
Hiroshima Toyo Carp players
Hutchinson Community College alumni
Indianapolis Indians players
Kansas Jayhawks baseball players
Lakewood BlueClaws players
Lehigh Valley IronPigs players
Major League Baseball pitchers
Milwaukee Brewers players
New York Yankees players
Nippon Professional Baseball pitchers
Ottawa Lynx players
Philadelphia Phillies players
Pittsburgh Pirates players
Reading Phillies players
Reno Aces players
Sacramento River Cats players
Scranton/Wilkes-Barre RailRiders players
Sportspeople from Omaha, Nebraska
Toledo Mud Hens players
Yokohama DeNA BayStars players
Anchorage Glacier Pilots players